= Southern Cal =

Southern Cal may refer to:

- Southern California an area that generally comprises California's southernmost counties
- University of Southern California, colloquially "Southern Cal"
  - Southern Cal Trojans, athletic program and team name
